Liang Saizhen, also romanised as Liang Sa-tsen, was a Chinese film actress and cabaret dancer active in the 1920s and 1930s. She appeared in over 20 films in Shanghai, the vast majority of them silent films. After the Second Sino-Japanese War began in 1937, she fled to British Malaya, and probably died in Singapore.

Filmography

Personal life
Her younger sisters Liang Saizhu, Liang Saishan, and Liang Saihu also acted in some films. Liang Saizhu appeared in The Seashore Hero (1929), Madame Mai (1934), and Four Sisters (1935), as well as some films after 1935. Liang Saishan only appeared in Madame Mai and Four Sisters, and Liang Saihu only appeared in Four Sisters, which starred the four of them together.

References

People from Zhongshan
Actresses from Guangdong
20th-century Chinese actresses
Chinese film actresses
Chinese silent film actresses
Chinese emigrants to Singapore
Year of birth missing
Year of death missing